Got My Mojo Workin' is a 1966 album by Jimmy Smith arranged by Oliver Nelson.

Track listing 
 "Hi-Heel Sneakers" (Robert Higginbotham) – 5:03
 "(I Can't Get No) Satisfaction" (Mick Jagger, Keith Richards) – 4:23
 "1-2-3" (David White, John Medora, Len Barry) – 4:00
 "Mustard Greens" (Jimmy Smith) – 5:35
 "Got My Mojo Working" (Preston "Red" Foster) – 7:30
 "Johnny Come Lately" (Billy Strayhorn) – 3:45
 "C Jam Blues" (Duke Ellington) – 3:47
 "Hobson's Hop" (Smith) – 4:00

Personnel

Musicians
 Jimmy Smith – Hammond organ, vocals
 Oliver Nelson – arranger, conductor
 Kenny Burrell – guitar
 Ben Tucker, Ron Carter – double bass, (tracks 1–4)
 George Duvivier – double bass, (tracks 5–8)
 Grady Tate – drums
 Phil Woods – alto saxophone, (tracks 5–8)
 Jerome Richardson – baritone saxophone, (tracks 5–8)
 Romeo Penque – tenor saxophone, flute, (tracks 5–8)
 Ernie Royal – trumpet, (tracks 5–8)

Technical
 Creed Taylor – producer
 Rudy Van Gelder – engineer
 Val Valentin – director of engineering
 Michael Malatak – cover design
 Fred Seligo – cover photograph
 Orrin Keepnews – liner notes

Chart performance

Album

Single

References

1965 albums
Albums arranged by Oliver Nelson
Albums produced by Creed Taylor
Albums recorded at Van Gelder Studio
Jimmy Smith (musician) albums
Verve Records albums